Miele is a manufacturer of domestic appliances and commercial equipment.

Miele may also refer to:

People
 André Miele (born 1987), Brazilian tennis player
 Carl Miele (1869–1938), German entrepreneur
 Frank Miele (born 1948), American journalist
 Rudolf Miele (1929–2004), German entrepreneur
 Vittorio Miele (1926–1999), Italian painter

Other uses
 Miele (bicycle), a Canadian bicycle manufacturer
 Miele (film), a 2013 Italian film
 Miele (river), Germany 
 Miele Guide, a regional guide book to restaurants in Asia

See also